The Walking Wounded is the third studio album by American rock band Bayside.

Background and recording
Raneri had spent five months writing The Walking Wounded from August 2006, with the intent of releasing it in early 2007. In September 2006, the band went on a tour of the UK alongside other Victory acts, the Sleeping, Aiden and the Audition. On November 8, 2006, it was announced the band had begun recording. The band worked with producers Shep Goodman and Kenny Gioia, who had previously produced the band's self-titled album.

Release
In December 2006, Bayside went on a brief US East Coast tour, titled the First Annual Holiday Havoc Tour, with the Junior Varsity, Mêlée, and Bombers. On December 22, 2006, The Walking Wounded was announced for release in two months' time; alongside this, the track listing and artwork was posted online. "Duality" has been released as Bayside's first single off The Walking Wounded; it was made available for download on iTunes on January 23, 2007. The album was released on February 6. "Duality" was released to radio on the same day. A music video was released for the song on February 12, 2007; they performed it on Late Night with Conan O'Brien around the same time. In February and March, the band supported Anberlin on their tour of the US. In April 2007, they toured across the UK and then mainland Europe with Moneen and Attack in Black. Following this, they appeared at The Bamboozle festival. In May 2007, The Walking Wounded was released on vinyl; they went on tour with Alesana and the Status. From late June to late August, the band went on the 2007 edition of Warped Tour. From late October to early December, the group headlined the 2007 edition of the Victory Tour.

Raneri embarked on a solo acoustic tour in December 2007 and January 2008. From late January to early March 2008, the band went on a headlining tour of the US with support from Straylight Run, Four Year Strong, Tokyo Rose and the Status. The band supported the Starting Line on their headlining tour of the US in March and April. A music video was released for "Carry On" on March 27, 2008. According to Alternative Press, the video "features the band rocking amongst skyscrapers in a mock city". In April, the band appeared at the Bamboozle Left festival. The band re-issued The Walking Wounded on July 22. Dubbed The Walking Wounded: Gold Edition, the re-issue includes a special edition CD/DVD. The CD/DVD also includes new packaging, an acoustic set filmed at Looney Tunes record store on Long Island, a behind the scenes documentary filmed on tour and music videos.

Reception

The album debuted at number 75 on the U.S. Billboard 200 in mid-February, with about 13,000 copies sold. By August 2008, the album sold 69,000 copies.

Track listing

Gold Edition bonus DVD
The Walking Wounded (Documentary)
Bayside On Tour (Life On The Road Featurette)
Tech Talk (Gear Walk Through)
Duality (Official Music Video)
Carry On (Official Music Video)

Personnel
Anthony Raneri - rhythm guitar, vocals
Jack O'Shea - lead guitar, backing vocals
Nick Ghanbarian - bass
Chris Guglielmo - drums, percussion

Additional personnel
Vinnie Caruana of I Am the Avalanche - guest vocals on "The Walking Wounded"
Arthur Bacon - keyboards

References

External links

The Walking Wounded (Gold Edition) at YouTube (streamed copy where licensed)
 The Walking Wounded Album News
 Bayside's Myspace Page
 Bayside @ PureVolume
 Official Track Listing
 Archived News by AbsolutePunk.net

2007 albums
Bayside (band) albums
Victory Records albums
Albums produced by Shep Goodman